Bolomba is a city in the Democratic Republic of the Congo. It is the capital of the Bolomba Territory.

References

See also 

 List of cities in the Democratic Republic of the Congo

Populated places in the province of Équateur